Bugala Power Station is a  biodiesel-fired thermal power plant located on Bugala Island, in Kalangala District, in the Ssese Islands Archipelago, on Lake Victoria, in south-central Uganda.

Location
The power station is located on Bugala Island, the largest island in the Ssese Islands Archipelago, in Kalangala District, in Lake Victoria, Africa's largest fresh-water lake, in Uganda's Central Region. This location is near the town of Kalangala, where the district headquarters are located, approximately nautical , by water, southwest of the town of Entebbe, on the mainland.

Overview
Bugala Power Station is integrated in design and construction with the palm oil processing plant owned by Bidco Oil Refineries Limited. Bidco owns a  palm oil plantation on Bugala Island, where the power station is located. The oil processing factory crushes the palm oil fruits into crude palm oil. The residue is burned, generating heat, which is used to boil water, creating steam. The steam is used to turn turbines and create electricity in the process. The electricity is used within the factory and any excess is sold to the neighboring town of Kalangala. Power is also generated by burning fibers from the tree trunks, known as bagasse.

Construction of the power station was completed and commissioned in March 2010. The power plant and oil processing factory is a joint effort between the Ugandan Government, the International Fund for Agricultural Development (IFAD), the World Bank and Oil Palm Uganda. Oil Palm Uganda is a consortium between Wilmar International, a conglomerate that specializes in  the development of agricultural plantations and  Bidco Oil Refineries Limited, an oil processing company.

Uganda Palm Oil Project 
Bugala Power Station is a byproduct of the Uganda Palm Oil project. The project was co-funded by Oil Palm Uganda which provided US$120 million, while IFAD provided a loan of US$19.9 million. The Government of Uganda contributed US$12 million for land, electricity and roads. Local farmers contributed US$3.16 million through labor, equity and land. The power station and oil processing factory cost US$10 million to construct. Bidco already maintains a palm oil refinery in Uganda, located in Jinja, Uganda's second industrial city.

Shareholding
The investment profile of the Uganda Palm Oil Project is summarized in the table below:

See also

List of power stations in Uganda
Kalangala
Bugala Island
Kalangala District
Central Region, Uganda

References

External links
 Bidco Uganda Homepage
 Profile of the Oil Processing Factory

Oil-fired power stations in Uganda
Renewable energy power stations in Uganda
Kalangala District
Central Region, Uganda
Biofuels in Uganda
Palm oil production in Uganda
2010 establishments in Uganda
Biodiesel